Triorbis annulata is a moth in the family Nolidae first described by Charles Swinhoe in 1890. It is found in Myanmar, Peninsular Malaysia, on Borneo and Luzon.

Adults have dark red-brown forewings with a much reduced lens-shaped basal streak.

External links

Nolidae
Moths of Borneo
Moths described in 1890